Monica Sehgal (born 6 March 1990) is an Indian television actress known for her role Radhika Mishra in Dosti... Yaariyan... Manmarziyan which aired on Star Plus.

Early life and education 
Monica was born on 6 March 1990,Ujjain.
She completed her graduation and postpost-graduation from Xavier College, 
Mumbai.

Career 
In 2015, she made her television debut with show Dosti... Yaariyan... Manmarziyan' opposite Aham Sharma.

After that in 2016 she was seen as Bahamani in Chakravartin Ashoka Samrat.

In 2016, she was seen as kavya in Bindass's Yeh Hai Aashiqui.

In 2018, She hosted the 7th Season of Zee TV reality show 'Foodshala' which was specifically designed for Middle-East audiences.
And also seen anchoring India’s first-ever live trivia game show, Loco, from the house of Pocket Aces.

Television

References

External links 

Living people
Indian television actresses
People from Ujjain
1990 births